Papyrus 5 (in the Gregory-Aland numbering), designated by siglum , is an early copy of the New Testament in Greek. It is a papyrus manuscript of the Gospel of John dating palaeographically to the early 3rd century. The papyrus is housed in the British Library. It has survived in a very fragmentary condition.

The text of the manuscript was reconstructed several times. Textually it is very close to Codex Sinaiticus, but with some exceptions.

Description
The manuscript is a fragment of three leaves, written in one column per page, 27 lines per page. The surviving text of John are verses 1:23-31,33-40; 16:14-30; 20:11-17,19-20,22-25.

It was written in a documentary hand, in a round, upright uncial of medium size. It uses the nomina sacra with abbreviations, though not for ανθρωπος.

There is a tendency to brevity, especially in omitting unnecessary pronouns and conjunctions.

Text
According to reconstruction of Philip W. Comfort

Scribes and Correctors
In John 1:38 "οι δε" was added superlineary; αυ was deleted by dots above the letters.

In John 16:19 "ο" was added superlineary.

In John 16:29 αυτω was added superlineary.

In John 20:19 και was added superlineary.

Textual character

In John 1:34 it reads ὁ ἐκλεκτός together with the manuscripts , א, b, e, ff2, syrc, s.

In John 16:17 at line 7 of the recto of the second fragment there appears to be extra space which would require some additional material.

In John 16:20, λυπηθησεσθε originally read λουπηθησεσθε, to which the scribe corrected to λυπηθησεσθε. In 16:21, λυπην originally read λοιπην, to which the scribe corrected to λυπην. In 16:27, it singularly omits εγω. In 20:19 the scribe originally omitted και, but then added it superlinearly later on.

At line 19 of the third folio of the recto (John 20:16) the missing fragment is difficult for a reconstruction. Grenfell & Hunt remarked that there is no space for the ordinary reading ο λεγεται διδασκαλε because a line should have 34 letters, which is too long. Grenfell & Hunt rejected another possible reading  διδασκαλε, which is found in Codex Bezae (possible conflation), and proposed  alone, because Domine is found in Codex Vercellensis and in Codex Usserianus I, but in the reconstructed text of the manuscript they did not decide to include this proposed variant to the text:
 αρω [λεγει αυτη  μαριαμ στραφει
 [σα εκεινη λεγει αυτω εβραιστι ραβ
 β[ουνι . . . . . . . . . . . λεγει αυτη 

All the editors agree that the space is insufficient for ο λεγεται διδασκαλε (John 20,16) but  alone is too short and it is not supported by any Greek manuscript. Elliott & Parker have suggested ο λεγεται . It was supported by Peter Head. Comfort proposed  μου though this reading is not supported by any known Greek manuscript. It is close for  διδασκαλε of Codex Bezae and Old-Latin Magister Domine or Domine.

The Greek text of this codex is representative of the Western text-type. Aland ascribed it as a "Normal text", and placed it in Category I. It stays in close agreement with Codex Sinaiticus against Codex Vaticanus (e.g. John 1:27.34; 16:22.27.28; 20:25). "This agreement is unfortunately obscured by mutilation".

History
The manuscript was discovered at the end of the 19th century by Grenfell and Hunt in Oxyrhynchus, Egypt. The first and third leaves were published in Oxyrhynchus Papyri, Part II (1899), no. 208. Gregory classified it under number 5 on his list.
The second leaf (John 16:14-30) was published in 1922 as Oxyrhynchus no. 1781.

It was examined by Grenfell, Hunt, Wessely, Schofield, Comfort, and Barrett.

It is currently housed at the British Library (Inv. nos. 782, 2484) in London.

See also
 John 1, John 16, John 20
 List of New Testament papyri
 Oxyrhynchus papyri
 Oxyrhynchus Papyri 159 through 207
 Papyrus Oxyrhynchus 209

References

Further reading
 
 
 C. R. Gregory, "Textkritik des Neuen Testaments", Leipzig 1909, vol. 3, p. 1085.
 
 Karl Wessely, Les plus anciens monuments du christianisme, PO 4/2 (1907), pp. 145–148.

External links

 

New Testament papyri
208
3rd-century biblical manuscripts
Early Greek manuscripts of the New Testament
British Library collections
Gospel of John papyri